Kołaczkowo may refer to the following places:
Kołaczkowo, Gniezno County in Greater Poland Voivodeship (west-central Poland)
Kołaczkowo, Września County in Greater Poland Voivodeship (west-central Poland)
Kołaczkowo, Kuyavian-Pomeranian Voivodeship (north-central Poland)